Staffan Hallerstam (born 21 May 1957 in Stockholm) is a Swedish actor and physician. He is father to Leo Hallerstam.

When Hallerstam became an adult, he participated in include Gamle Adam and Min käre man at Vasateatern in Stockholm and he participated in Bamse at Fria teatern in Högdalen in Stockholm. Under the 1980s and 1990s Hallerstam dubbed voices in particular Duck Tales, where he dubbed the voices to Huey, Dewey and Louie until Monica Forsberg took over. After that he became a doctor, which he is until present.

Filmography
 1995 – Casper (voice)
 1994 - Sonic the Hedgehog (voice)
 1993 – Adventures of Sonic the Hedgehog (voice)
 1992 – Biker Mice from Mars (voice)
 1992 – Dog City (voice)
 1990 - The Rescuers Down Under (voice)
 1986 - Silver Fang (voice)
 1982 - Zoombie
 1981 - Operation Leo
 1974 - Världens bästa Karlsson
 1972 - The Man Who Quit Smoking
 1970 - Pippi in the South Seas
 1969 - Pippi Longstocking
 1969 – Kråkguldet
 1967 – Kullamannen

References

External links

1957 births
Living people
Swedish male television actors
Swedish male voice actors
Swedish male film actors
Karolinska Institute alumni